The Hexanauplia is a clade proposed by Oakley et al. (2013) that constitutes a class of crustaceans, comprising the Copepoda and Thecostraca. A number of recent phylogenomic studies have not found support for this clade.

Classification 

This taxon is no longer accepted according to the World Register of Marine Species (May, 2022).   Copepoda and Thecostraca are now treated as classes in Superclass Multicrustacea, along with classes Malacostraca and Tantulocarida.

References

External links 

Crustaceans
Arthropod classes